The El Colegio de Veracruz (Colver) is a college in the city of Xalapa, Veracruz, Mexico.

Xalapa
Universities and colleges in Veracruz